Guillaume Ricaldo Elmont (born 10 August 1981 in Rotterdam) is a male retired judoka from the Netherlands, whose biggest success so far was winning the world title at the World Championships in Cairo, Egypt. He did so in the 73–81 kg weight division. In 2005 he became Amsterdam Sportsman of the year.
He has represented the Netherlands three times at the Olympics, in 2004, 2008 and 2012. He is a son of Surinamese judoka Ricardo Elmont and brother of Dex Elmont.

Since the Summer of 2015 he has been the performance coach for Dutch association football club Ajax Amsterdam.

Achievements

References

External links
 
 
 Videos of Guillaume Elmont at JudoVision.org

1981 births
Living people
Dutch male judoka
Dutch sportspeople of Surinamese descent
European Games bronze medalists for the Netherlands
European Games medalists in judo
Judoka at the 2004 Summer Olympics
Judoka at the 2008 Summer Olympics
Judoka at the 2012 Summer Olympics
Judoka at the 2015 European Games
Olympic judoka of the Netherlands
Sportspeople from Rotterdam
World judo champions
AFC Ajax non-playing staff